Colocasia is a genus of flowering plants in the family Araceae, native to southeastern Asia and the Indian subcontinent. Some species are widely cultivated and naturalized in other tropical and subtropical regions. 

The names elephant-ear and cocoyam are also used for some other large-leaved genera in the Araceae, notably Xanthosoma and Caladium. The generic name is derived from the ancient Greek word kolokasion, which in Greek, botanist Dioscorides (1st century AD) may have inferred the edible roots of both Colocasia esculenta and Nelumbo nucifera. 

The species Colocasia esculenta is invasive in wetlands along the American Gulf coast, where it threatens to displace native wetland plants.

Description
They are herbaceous perennial plants with a large corm on or just below the ground surface. The elephant's-ear plant gets its name from the leaves, which are shaped like a large ear or shield. The plant reproduces mostly by means of rhizomes (tubers, corms), but it also produces "clusters of two to five fragrant inflorescences in the leaf axils". Like other members of the family, the plant contains an irritant which causes intense discomfort to the lips, mouth and throat. This acridity is caused in part by microscopic needle-like raphides of calcium oxalate monohydrate. It must be processed by cooking, soaking or fermenting – sometimes along with an acid (lime or tamarind) – before being eaten.

Species

There are numerous species of Colocasia.

 Colocasia affinis Schott - Yunnan, Nepal, Assam, Bhutan, Bangladesh, Myanmar, eastern Himalayas 
 Colocasia antiquorum, sometimes considered a synonym of C. esculenta.
 Colocasia esculenta (L.) Schott - taro, elephant-ear, eddoe - native to southern China, the Indian subcontinent, Indochina, Sumatra; naturalized in other parts of Asia as well as Africa, southern Europe, South America, Central America, the West Indies, the southeastern United States, and many oceanic islands including Hawaii
 Colocasia fallax Schott - Tibet, Yunnan, Himalayas, northern Indochina
 Colocasia fontanesii Schott - Yunnan, eastern Himalayas, northern Indochina
 Colocasia gigantea (Blume) Hook.f. – giant taro - southern China, Indochina, Malaysia, western Indonesia
 Colocasia hassanii H.Ara  -Bangladesh
 Colocasia lihengiae C.L.Long & K.M.Liu - Arunachal Pradesh, Yunnan
 Colocasia mannii Hook.f. - Assam, Nicobar Islands
 Colocasia menglaensis J.T.Yin, H.Li & Z.F.Xu  - Yunnan, Laos, Myanmar, Thailand, Vietnam 
 Colocasia oresbia A.Hay - Bangladesh, Sabah
 Colocasia tonoimo A.Hay - Unknown

Ecology
Colocasia species are used as food plants by the larvae of some Lepidoptera species including Palpifer murinus and Palpifer sexnotatus.

Cultivation 

C. esculenta and other members of the genus are cultivated as ornamental plants, or for their edible corms, a traditional starch staple in many tropical areas.

The plant can be grown in the ground or in large containers. They are grown outside year-round in subtropical and tropical areas. In temperate regions, they are planted out for the summer and dug up and stored over winter, dry and with ventilation to prevent fungal infection. They can be grown in almost any temperature zone as long as the summer is warm. The plants can be damaged if temperatures fall below  for more than a few days.

The root tuber is typically planted close to the surface. The first signs of growth will appear in 1 to 3 weeks. The adult plant will need a minimum of at least  of space for good growth. They do best in compost-rich soil and in shade, but will grow reasonably well in average soil provided it is moisture-retentive. The plants should not be left to go dry for too long; if this does happen, the leaves will wilt; watering will allow the plant to recover if done before they get too dry. Periodic fertilisation (every 3 to 4 weeks) with a common plant fertiliser will increase yields.

Culinary uses 

The edible types are grown in the South Pacific and eaten like potatoes and known as taro, eddoe, and dasheen. The leaves are often boiled with coconut milk to make a soup.

Poi, a Hawaiian dish, is made by boiling the starchy underground stem of the plant then mashing it into a paste.

In Cyprus 

In Cyprus, Colocasia has been in use since the time of the Roman Empire. Today it is known as kolokasi (Kολοκάσι). It is usually cooked with celery and pork or chicken, in a tomato sauce in casserole. "Baby" kolokasi is called "poulles": after being fried dry, red wine and coriander seed are added, and then it is served with freshly squeezed lemon. Lately, some restaurants have begun serving thin slices of kolokasi deep fried, calling them "kolokasi chips".

In Greece 

Apart from Cyprus, Colocasia is found in one other Mediterranean island, the Greek island of Ikaria. After the island was declared a Blue zone its culinary tradition has acquired some popularity and Colocasia (or kolokasi - Κολοκάσι in Greek) is part of that tradition. The plant has been reported to have been a vital source of food during WW II. In Ikaria, after it is boiled it is usually eaten as a salad (with raw onions, herbs, olive oil, lemon etc.).

In the Indian subcontinent 

Both roots and leaves are eaten. In most of India and Pakistan the root is called arbi.  Common preparations include cooking with curry, frying, and boiling. In Mithalanchal (Bihar), the leaf is called airkanchan and is curried.

In Gujarat, arbi leaves are used to make the dish patra. In Eastern part of Uttar Pradesh, arbi, known as arabi ka patta, is used to make the dish sahina. Arbi is also a very popular dish among the Hindu community in South Africa, where it is known as patha. In Manipur, the leaves are used in the Meitei ethnic cuisine, locally known as utti (pronounce ootti). The leaves are called paangkhoklaa by the Meiteis, while the edible corms are known as paan. Paan is often cooked with fermented soy beans to make curries. It is also used to make eromba, a Meitei side dish. 

In Odisha, the arvi the root is called saru. it is an important ingredient in dalma, a popular Odia dish. The leaves used in a dish called "saru magura",  made with rice batter inside the leaf which is steamed and fried.

In Kerala, the leaves are used to make chembila curry, and the roots are used in chembu puzhukku, a traditional accompaniment to Kerala chembu. Various other recipes also exist locally. The stem and root are used in the preparation of stew and curry. In Kerala, chembu is planted in the month of May and can be harvested in December of the same year.

In Maharashtra, the leaves are called aloo and are used to make a sweet and sour curry with peanuts and cashew nuts that is commonly cooked during marriages. The leaf bases are mixed with curd to make the side dish dethi. The leaves are also coated in besan and fried to make the snack paatwadi or aloowadi.

In Gujarat, this leaf is called arbi (or alvi) and is used to make patra. This is a steamed dish similar to patrode, but with gram flour instead of the rice flour used in patrode. As in Maharashtra, the leaves are eaten as a fried snack.

In Nagaland, the leaves are dried, powdered, kneaded into a dough and baked into biscuits. These biscuits are burnt and dissolved in boiling water before being added into meat dishes to create a thick, flavourful dry gravy.

In Bengal, the plant is called kachu. Its leaves are used to wrap fish and prawns for steaming to make bhapa mach (steamed fish). The roots are used to make a thick creamy curry in which to cook prawns. The roots and stems are grated with coconut and used to create a chutney.

In South Karnataka particularly in the coastal regions , the leaves are made into a traditional dish called as ‘patrode’or ‘patrude’.

In Himachal Pradesh, in northern India, taro corms are known as ghandyali in Mandi districts, and the plant is also known as kachalu in the Kangra district. The dish called patrodu is made using taro leaves rolled with corn or gram flour and boiled in water. Another dish, pujji is made with mashed leaves and the trunk of the plant and ghandyali or taro corms are prepared as a separate dish. In Shimla, a pancake-style dish, called patra or patid, is made using gram flour.

In art 

In the Levant, Colocasia has been in use since the time of the Byzantine Empire. The leaves are shown in mosaics from Israel as a platform, such as a plate or bowl, for serving of fruit to eat. For example, at the Kursi church mosaic.

Nutrition
Taro roots and leaves are rich in carbohydrates, protein, and dietary minerals. Micronutrients include iron, copper, magnesium, potassium, and zinc.

Phytochemicals
Colocasia leaves contain phytochemicals, such as anthraquinones, apigenin, catechins, cinnamic acid derivatives, vitexin, and isovitexin.

Gallery

See also 
 Cocoyam

References 

Araceae genera
Aroideae